Ming-Na Wen (born November 20, 1963) is an American actress and model. She is best known for voicing Mulan in the animated film Mulan and its sequel and for playing Melinda May / The Cavalry in Marvel's Agents of S.H.I.E.L.D. (2013–2020) and Fennec Shand in the Star Wars franchise in The Mandalorian (2019–2020), The Bad Batch (2021) and The Book of Boba Fett (2021–2022). She was named [[TVLine|TVLine'''s Performer of the Week]] for her work in the episode, "Melinda".

Wen made her breakthrough in The Joy Luck Club (1993) as June Woo. She also played Dr. Jing-Mei "Deb" Chen in the medical drama series ER (1995–2004). She has also reprised the role as Mulan in the video game Kingdom Hearts II (2005), Sofia the First (2014), and Ralph Breaks the Internet (2018). Additionally, Wen made a cameo appearance in the live-action remake of Mulan (2020). 

She has also had starring roles as Chun-Li in Street Fighter (1994), Detective Ellen Yin in The Batman (2004–2005) and Camile Wray in Stargate Universe (2009–2011). She was honored as a Disney Legend in 2019.

Early life

Wen was born on November 20, 1963, in Coloane, one of the two main islands of Macau. Her mother Lin Chan Wen moved to Macau in the mid-1960s, from Suzhou, China. Her father is of Malaysian Chinese descent. She has an older brother named Jonathan. 

Wen's parents divorced when she was an infant, and she moved with her brother and mother to Hong Kong. Wen attended a Catholic school in Hong Kong, while her mother held down three jobs to provide for her and her brother. Her mother remarried to Chinese American Soo Lim Yee, and when Wen was four years old, the family moved to New York City. Her younger brother Leong was born there. After five years, Wen's mother and stepfather relocated again, this time to the Pittsburgh, Pennsylvania, area, where they opened The Chinatown Inn restaurant, which is still operating. Raised in the suburb of Mt. Lebanon, Pennsylvania, she attended Mount Lebanon High School and graduated from Carnegie Mellon University in 1986 having majored in Theatre.

Career
1985–1997: Breakthrough with The Joy Luck Club
Wen's first television role was as a royal trumpeter in the children's television series Mister Rogers' Neighborhood in 1985. From 1988 to 1991, she played Lien Hughes, the daughter of Tom Hughes, on the soap opera As the World Turns.

After starring in the acclaimed 1993 film The Joy Luck Club, she landed the role of Dr. Jing-Mei "Deb" Chen on the NBC drama series ER. She first starred in a recurring role during the 1994–1995 season before returning in 1999 as a series regular, remaining on the show until midway through Season 11 in 2004. Wen also played Chun-Li in Street Fighter and co-starred on the sitcom The Single Guy from 1995 to 1997.

1998–2012: Mulan, established actress and other ventures

She provided the voice for the title character in the 1998 animated film Mulan, its direct-to-video sequel, Mulan II, and the video game Kingdom Hearts II, subsequently winning an Annie Award. She voiced Aki Ross in the computer animated film Final Fantasy: The Spirits Within, and Detective Ellen Yin in the animated series The Batman. She was also the voice actress for Jade, a minor character in the HBO animated series Spawn.

In 2004, she took part in a Hollywood Home Game on the World Poker Tour, and won. In fall 2005, she starred on the NBC drama series Inconceivable as the lead character, Rachel Lu. However, the series was canceled after only two episodes. Her next TV role was an FBI agent in the Fox kidnap drama series Vanished, which premiered in the fall of 2006 but was canceled. She also played a college professor in the comedy series George Lopez.

On October 8 through October 29, 2007, Wen (billed as Ming Wen) appeared in a four-episode arc of CBS's Two and a Half Men, playing Charlie Sheen's love interest, a judge closer to his own age. In November 2008, she guest-starred on two ABC series: Private Practice and Boston Legal. From December 5–6, 2008, Wen starred in a benefit production of the musical Grease with "Stuttering" John Melendez at the Class Act Theatre.

She was cast as a regular in the Stargate Universe television series as political attaché Camile Wray from October 2009 to May 2011. Wen made an appearance in Disney Through the Decades, a short documentary about the history of The Walt Disney Company through to the present, as the hostess of the 1990s section.

Wen appeared on the Syfy series Eureka as the inquisitive U.S. Senator Michaela Wen, beginning in season four in 2011 and serving as a major villain in the fifth and final season in 2012.

2013–present: Agents of S.H.I.E.L.D. and current work

Wen starred as Agent Melinda May in the ABC superhero drama series Agents of S.H.I.E.L.D., which premiered on September 24, 2013.

In August 2014, Wen reprised her role as Mulan for the first time since Kingdom Hearts II in the Disney Channel series Sofia the First. Wen's daughter has a recurring role on the show as Princess Jun.

On December 7, 2017, Marvel Entertainment launched a new animation film franchise Marvel Rising: Secret Warriors. Wen voiced Hala the Accuser, the main antagonist of the film, working with Agents of S.H.I.E.L.D. co-star Chloe Bennet. That same year, she once again provided the voice of Mulan in Ralph Breaks the Internet.

In 2019, it was announced that Wen would be a cast-member of the Star Wars TV series The Mandalorian, playing Fennec Shand. She reprised the role vocally in Star Wars: The Bad Batch, and the live-action series The Book of Boba Fett. In September 2021, Wen was cast as Ivy in the LGBTQIA+ jukebox musical feature Glitter & Doom with Missi Pyle.

In 2022, Wen made an appearance on Young Sheldon as Dr. Lee, an experimental physicist responsible for mitigating conflict within a team of scientists. She is set to recur on the second season of HBO Max's Hacks.

Artistry and legacy

Wen's roles as Melinda May and Fennec Shand in Agents of S.H.I.E.L.D. and The Book of Boba Fett respectively, have received critical acclaim. In December 2021, she was included in the list of BBC's 100 Women of 2021. Wen is set to receive a star on the Hollywood Walk of Fame in 2022 alongside Ewan McGregor and Carrie Fisher. 

She is also well known for her work with Disney. WDW Magazine writer Aaron Widmar called Wen an "incredibly talented Chinese actress, who has had a remarkable career that seems to only gain steam as it progresses—a rarity in Hollywood". He went on to say that she has "broken through barriers for Asian performers". She was named a Disney Legend at the 2019 D23 Expo for her outstanding contributions to the Disney company.

Personal life
In 1990, Wen married American film writer Kirk Aanes. They divorced three years later. On June 16, 1995, Wen married Eric Michael Zee and together they have a daughter and a son. Wen's first pregnancy was written into the ER script, with her character putting the child up for adoption. Wen's daughter followed her mother's footsteps in voice acting, and voices Princess Jun in the Disney Channel-animated series Sofia the First''.

Wen is trilingual, fluent in English, Cantonese and Mandarin.

Filmography

Film

Television

Web series

Video games

Awards and nominations

References

External links 

 
 
 

1963 births
Living people
20th-century American actresses
21st-century American actresses
Actresses from California
Models from California
Actresses from New York City
Models from New York City
American actresses of Chinese descent
American people of Malaysian descent
American film actresses
American models
American soap opera actresses
American Buddhists
American video game actresses
American voice actresses
Annie Award winners
Carnegie Mellon University College of Fine Arts alumni
Macau emigrants to the United States
Macau emigrants to Hong Kong
Hong Kong emigrants to the United States
People from Calabasas, California
People from Mt. Lebanon, Pennsylvania
People from Queens, New York
Macau people
BBC 100 Women